"I Cried for You" is a pop and jazz standard with music written by Gus Arnheim and Abe Lyman, with lyrics by Arthur Freed. It was introduced by Abe Lyman and His Orchestra in 1923. The recording by Benny Krueger and His Orchestra the same year peaked at number 2 for two weeks and remained in the charts for ten weeks at large. Also in 1923 another interpretation of the song by the Columbians reached number 14 for one week. 15 years later in 1938 two new recordings peaked both number 13 in the Billboard charts, Bunny Berigan and His Orchestra with Kathleen Lane on vocals and an interpretation by Bing Crosby (a minor hit for him). Glen Gray and his Casa Loma Orchestra followed the next year, peaking at number 6, and in 1942 Harry James' recording was the last to get into the Billboard charts, peaking at number 19.

I Cried for You was also featured in several films including the musical short Alladin from Manhattan (1936) (starring Ruth Etting), The Women (1939), Idiot’s Delight (1939) and Babes in Arms, sung by Judy Garland (1939). In 1944 Helen Forrest sang it in Bathing Beauty with Harry James and His Music Makers. Frank Sinatra interpreted the song in The Joker Is Wild (1957), and Diana Ross sang it in Lady Sings the Blues, personifying Billie Holiday (1972).

Recordings

References

1923 songs
Songs with lyrics by Arthur Freed
Songs written by Abe Lyman
Songs written by Gus Arnheim